"Back 2 Good" is a song by American rock band Matchbox 20, released as the fifth single from their 1996 debut album, Yourself or Someone Like You, in September 1998.

Meaning
The song was written by lead singer Rob Thomas and producer Matt Serletic, and is about a romantic relationship that seems to have reached its end, much to the chagrin of the singer. Rob Thomas has described the song to be about “screwing up so often that you become used to it.” Thomas has also said that “Back 2 Good”, over all other songs on the album “holds up as a song”.

Music video
"Back 2 Good" was released with a music video, directed by an uncredited Paul Hunter. The music video features the band walking through a street carnival while Thomas sings the lyrics to the song.

Release and reception
"Back 2 Good" was the band's biggest hit song on the US Billboard Hot 100 from Yourself or Someone Like You—peaking at number 24 in 1999—because their more successful prior hits, "Push" and "3AM", were not allowed to chart due to not receiving commercial releases in the US. The chart rules were changed in December 1998 to allow songs to chart from airplay alone, making "Back 2 Good" their first single able to receive a full chart run. In Canada, the song peaked at number 11 on the RPM Top Singles chart, becoming the band's fourth top-20 hit.

Track listings
US 7-inch single
A. "Back 2 Good" – 5:40
B. "Push" – 3:59

Australian CD single
 "Back 2 Good" – 5:40
 "Kody" (MTV's Live from the 10 Spot) – 3:57
 "Damn" (MTV's Live from the 10 Spot) – 3:57

Charts

Weekly charts

Year-end charts

References

1996 songs
1998 singles
Atlantic Records singles
Lava Records singles
Matchbox Twenty songs
Music videos directed by Paul Hunter (director)
Song recordings produced by Matt Serletic
Songs written by Rob Thomas (musician)
Songs written by Matt Serletic